Bethesda is an unincorporated community in the town of Genesee, Waukesha County, Wisconsin, United States. The community was named for Bethesda Park, a spa and tourist resort built around a medicinal spring developed by Richard Dunbar in the late 1860s.

Notes

Unincorporated communities in Waukesha County, Wisconsin
Unincorporated communities in Wisconsin